Tim Priest may refer to:

 Tim Priest (police officer), Australian police officer
 Tim Priest (American football) (born 1949), American attorney, broadcaster and former football player